Basketball competitions at the 2017 Islamic Solidarity Games was held from 18 to 21 May 2017 at the Basketball Arena in Baku. The competition was taken place in the half-court 3x3 format. Each team consisted of four athletes, of whom three could appear on court at any one time.

Medalists

Medal table

Men

Preliminary round

Group A

Group B

Knockout round

Women

Preliminary round

Group A

Group B

Knockout round

References 
Results

2017 Islamic Solidarity Games
2017
Basketball in Azerbaijan
Islamic Solidarity Games